Dasarathi Hazra Memorial College, established in 2013, is the general degree college in Purba Bardhaman district. It offers undergraduate courses in arts. It is affiliated to  University of Burdwan.

Departments

Arts

Bengali
English
Sanskrit
History
Education
Political Science

See also

References

External links
http://www.buruniv.ac.in/CollegeDetails.php?col_code=658

Colleges affiliated to University of Burdwan
Educational institutions established in 2013
Universities and colleges in Purba Bardhaman district
2013 establishments in West Bengal